Quirino, officially the Province of Quirino, is a landlocked province in the Philippines located in the Cagayan Valley region in Luzon. Its capital is Cabarroguis. It is named after Elpidio Quirino, the sixth President of the Philippines.

The province borders Aurora to the southeast, Nueva Vizcaya to the west, and Isabela to the north. Quirino used to be part of the province of Nueva Vizcaya, until it was separated in 1966.

History
Long before its formal creation as an independent province, Quirino was the forest region of the province of Nueva Vizcaya, inhabited by tribal groups known as the Negritos. They roamed the hinterlands and built their huts at the heart of the jungle.

On June 18, 1966, Republic Act No. 4734 was enacted, constituting the municipalities of Diffun, Saguday, Aglipay, and Maddela, all from Nueva Vizcaya province, into a new sub-province to be known as "Quirino", named after the late Philippine President Elpidio Quirino.

On June 21, 1969, Republic Act No. 5554 was enacted, amending RA 4734, and creating the municipality of Cabarroguis (now the provincial capital town), which was taken from portions of Diffun, Saguday, and Aglipay.

Republic Act No. 6394, authored by then-Congressman Leonardo B. Perez (Nueva Vizcaya–Lone), was passed on September 10, 1971, further amending RA 5554 and separating the sub-province of Quirino from its mother province, Nueva Vizcaya, constituting it into a regular province.

The province of Quirino was formally established on February 10, 1972, upon the assumption to office of the first elected provincial and municipal officials headed by Dionisio Sarandi as Provincial Governor.

On February 25, 1983, Batas Pambansa Blg. 345 was enacted, creating within Quirino the municipality of Nagtipunan, a division of the municipality of Maddela.

Geography

Quirino covers a total area of  occupying the southeastern section of the Cagayan Valley region. A landlocked province, it is situated within the upper portion of the Cagayan River basin and bounded by Isabela on the north, Aurora on the east and southeast, and Nueva Vizcaya on the west and southwest.

The Sierra Madre mountain range provides a natural barrier on the eastern and southern border of the province and the Namamparang Range on the western part. The province is generally mountainous, with about 80 percent of the total land area covered by mountains and highlands. A large portion of the province lies within the Quirino Protected Landscape.

Climate
June is generally the warmest month and the wettest months are March to August, with the rest of the year being neither too dry nor too wet. Heavy, sustained rainfall occurs from September to November.

Administrative divisions
Quirino comprises 6 municipalities, all encompassed by a single legislative district.

Barangays
The 6 municipalities of the province comprise a total of 132 barangays, with Gundaway (Poblacion) in Cabarroguis as the most populous in 2010, and Rang-ayan in Aglipay as the least.

Demographics

The major languages are Ilocano and Ifugao. Other languages are Bugkalot, Pangasinan, Kankana-ey, Tagalog, and English.

Religion
Quirino is predominantly Roman Catholic with 54 percent adherence while Evangelicals and United Methodist Church serve as significant minorities with up to 20% of the population. Some people still practice indigenous beliefs. Other Christians such as the Iglesia ni Cristo (forming more than 5% of the province population), mainline Protestant and Aglipanyan are also well represented. Other religious groups are also have some minor adherents such as Islam.

Economy

Agriculture is the main industry in the province, with rice and corn as major crops. These supply the demand of neighboring provinces and the metropolis. It is the leading producer of banana in the Cagayan Valley region. Banana as well as banana chips are major products sold in Metro Manila and Pampanga. Small scale industries like furniture making, basketry, rattan craft, and dried flower production are prevalent.

Government

References

External links

 
 
 Official Website of the Provincial Government of Quirino
 Local Governance Performance Management System 

 
Provinces of the Philippines
Provinces of Cagayan Valley
States and territories established in 1971
1971 establishments in the Philippines
Former sub-provinces of the Philippines